Group-Office is a PHP based dual license commercial/open source groupware and CRM and DMS product developed by the Dutch company Intermesh.  The open source version, Group-Office Community,  is licensed under the AGPL, and is available via SourceForge. GroupOffice Professional is a commercial product and offers additionally mobile synchronisation, project management and time tracking.

The online suite puts independent office applications onto a central server, making them accessible through a web browser. The suite includes file management, address book, calendar, email notes and website content management modules. The email client has IMAP and  S/MIME support, the calendar supports iCalendar import, and it can be synchronised with personal digital assistants, mobile phones, and Microsoft Outlook. In the Professional version, it is possible to create templates to export to Open Document Format or Microsoft Word. Files can be managed in an inbuilt file manager, and accessed through WebDAV. Users may be managed within the application or in an LDAP system.

A LAMP environment is recommended on the server, and an OSNews.com review describes the installation process as "straightforward".  Linux is recommended as the system software, but it also runs on other Unix systems, including BSD Unix, and Mac OS X. From version 2.17 and up, Microsoft Windows is also supported as the system software.

In March 2010 Group-Office was compared to other collaborative software in the German c't magazine. A special version was included for the bundled DVD.

As of November 2012, the project has had over 420,000 downloads from SourceForge since its public appearance in March 2003. SourceForge made a blog post about Group-Office in 2010. Group-Office has had a stall and presentations at Linux Wochen 2005 in Vienna. and OSC2005 in Tokyo. The software has been translated into 27 locale with local communities in Japan and Austria.  Version 2.13 of the software was included in the Dutch The Open CD.

Mid 2012, Group-Office 4.0 was released. The PHP framework was completely rewritten using the Model View Controller design pattern. Version 4 was reviewed by PC World 

The software packages are maintained by a small team at Intermesh and has a small developer community, which is contributing features.

The headquarters are located in 's-Hertogenbosch, The Netherlands.

See also

 List of collaborative software
 Comparison of time-tracking software

References

External links
 Sourceforge.net blog post about Group-Office
 comparison of the Professional and the Community versions
 A video about Group-Office by an italian WebTv channel, called ICTv

Collaboration
Groupware
Free content management systems
Free software programmed in PHP
Web applications
Free groupware
Free email software
Software using the GNU AGPL license